Filippo Antonio Gualterio may refer to:
 Filippo Antonio Gualterio (cardinal) (1660–1728), papal nuncio to France,
 Filippo Antonio Gualterio (senator) (1819–1879), Italian Minister of the Interior of the Italian kingdom